Pithey is a surname. Notable people with the surname include:

Croye Pithey (1895–1920), South African World War I flying ace
David Pithey (1936–2018), Rhodesian  cricketer
Jack William Pithey (1903–?), Rhodesian politician
Tony Pithey (1933–2006), Rhodesian  cricketer
Wensley Pithey (1914–1993), South African-born British actor